Liédson da Silva Muniz (born 17 December 1977), known simply as Liédson, is a former footballer who played as a striker.

Nicknamed Levezinho ("Slender one") due to his light frame (63 kg), he spent the bulk of his professional career in Portugal representing Sporting CP, scoring nearly 120 goals in more than 200 competitive matches, winning four major titles with the club and helping it to four Champions League participations.

Born in Brazil, Liédson became a Portuguese citizen in 2009 and appeared with the national team at the 2010 World Cup, already in his 30s.

Club career

Early years
Born in Cairu, Bahia, Liédson started his professional career at Coritiba Foot Ball Club, aged 22. Before that he played amateur football on weekends, working at a supermarket during the week.

Liédson continued his career at Clube de Regatas do Flamengo and Sport Club Corinthians Paulista, traditional big clubs at Rio de Janeiro and São Paulo respectively, with relative individual success.

Sporting
Liédson was signed by Sporting CP for €2 million on 31 August 2003, giving manager Fernando Santos a new option following injuries and sales. On his debut, the "S" in his name was printed in reverse, which he took as a good omen and maintained it like that for the rest of his career.

Liédson was crowned top scorer in the Primeira Liga in his second season, scoring 25 goals while also netting nine in 14 games as his team reached the final of the UEFA Cup – this included a hat-trick in a 4–0 win at FC Dinamo Tbilisi in the group stage. The following year he finished second in the scoring race, scoring 15 times from 31 appearances (28 of which he played the full 90 minutes) with an impressive mark of 2,899 minutes played; he was top scorer again in 2006–07, but the Lions only conquered one domestic cup during that timeframe.

Considered by many as one of the greatest strikers in Sporting history since the early performances of Fernando Peyroteo, Héctor Yazalde, Manuel Fernandes, Rui Jordão, Fernando Gomes, Alberto Acosta and Mário Jardel, Liédson was also regarded as the club's top trademark player since the departures of Luís Figo, Cristiano Ronaldo, Nani and Ricardo Quaresma. He also ranked team top scorer in the UEFA Champions League, after scoring the lonely goal in the 2008–09 group stage contest against FC Shakhtar Donetsk on 22 October 2008. In the last group stage match, he also found the net – in a 2–5 home loss to FC Barcelona – for the 19th time in European competition, another club best; on 1 November he appeared in his 150th league match with the green-and-white striped jersey, 213 overall.

On 17 January 2010, after having missed one month due to injury, Liédson came from the bench to score twice, helping Sporting overcome C.D. Nacional 3–2 at home.  On 7 March, all of the game's goals were his as his team beat last-placed C.F. Os Belenenses 4–0 away.

Liédson entered Sporting's history books on 21 October 2010 as he scored the club's 200th goal in European competitions, netting twice in a 5–1 home win against K.A.A. Gent for the Europa League.

Return to Brazil
On 31 January 2011, after having appeared in 310 official matches with Sporting, scoring 174 goals, 33-year-old Liédson returned to his homeland, signing with former club Corinthians. He was still allowed to play with the Lions the following Friday, starting and scoring twice against Associação Naval 1º de Maio, in a 3–3 home draw.

Liédson contributed with ten games in the 2012 Copa Libertadores campaign, scoring once in the 6–0 group stage home win against Deportivo Táchira of Venezuela (immediately after missing a penalty kick) as the Timão won the continental competition for the first time in its history. On 31 July, he left Corinthians after both club and player decided not to renew his contract.

On 2 August 2012, Liédson agreed on a return to Flamengo, signing until December of the following year. In late January of the following year he came back to Portugal, joining FC Porto on a loan until the end of the season. On 11 May, he was involved in the goal that clinched the title for the Dragons against rivals S.L. Benfica in O Clássico; put on as a substitute by manager Vítor Pereira alongside Kelvin, he assisted the youngster's added-time winner.

International career
Liédson expressed interest in playing for the Portugal national team despite being Brazilian-born. He stated: "If one day I was called up to play, I wouldn’t hesitate for a second, as I feel right at home in Portugal." After the retirement of striker Pauleta, Liédson was one of the main candidates in line for succession, especially after countrymen Deco and Pepe's previous switches. Liédson's naturalization process created some controversy, as the Portuguese Football Players' Union in August 2009 publicly objected Portuguese Football Federation's (FPF) plans of expediting his citizenship.

After six years of residence in the country, Liédson received Portuguese nationality, being eligible to play for the country. On 26 August 2009, he was called up by national coach Carlos Queiroz for the 2010 FIFA World Cup qualifiers against Denmark and Hungary, and made his debut against the former on 5 September, coming on as a substitute for Tiago at half-time: after having been booked, he scored the final 1–1 in the 85th minute with a header from a corner.

Liédson started the first game in the final stages in South Africa, a 0–0 against Ivory Coast. He lost his place to Hugo Almeida for the following match, but both found the net in the 7–0 routing of North Korea on 21 June 2010, in Cape Town.

Career statistics

Club

1Includes the Taça da Liga and Supertaça Cândido de Oliveira.

International goals

Honours

Club
Corinthians
 Campeonato Brasileiro Série A: 2011
 Campeonato Paulista: 2003
 Copa Libertadores: 2012

Sporting
 Taça de Portugal: 2006–07, 2007–08
 Supertaça Cândido de Oliveira: 2007, 2008
 Taça da Liga: runner-up 2007–08, 2008–09
 UEFA Cup: runner-up 2004–05

Porto
 Primeira Liga: 2012–13
 Taça da Liga: runner-up 2012–13

Individual
 Copa Sul-Minas top scorer: 2002
 Bola de Prata: 2004–05, 2006–07
 SJPF Player of the Month: January 2006, April 2007, January 2009, April 2009, March 2010 (record)
 Campeonato Paulista top scorer: 2011

References

External links

1977 births
Living people
Sportspeople from Bahia
Brazilian emigrants to Portugal
Naturalised citizens of Portugal
Brazilian footballers
Portuguese footballers
Association football forwards
Campeonato Brasileiro Série A players
Coritiba Foot Ball Club players
CR Flamengo footballers
Sport Club Corinthians Paulista players
Primeira Liga players
Sporting CP footballers
FC Porto players
Portugal international footballers
2010 FIFA World Cup players
Brazilian expatriate footballers
Portuguese expatriate footballers
Expatriate footballers in Portugal
Brazilian expatriate sportspeople in Portugal